Africa, Prelude to Victory is a short dramatic propaganda film produced as part of the newsreel The March of Time. It shows the African campaigns of World War II. It was nominated for an Academy Award for Best Documentary Feature in 1943.

See also 
 List of Allied propaganda films of World War II

References

External links 
 
 Africa, Prelude to Victory at the National Archives and Records Administration

1942 short films
1940s war films
American World War II propaganda shorts
American black-and-white films
American war films
American short documentary films
1942 documentary films
20th Century Fox short films
1940s American films
1940s short documentary films